The Östanå II was steam ship, that was built in 1908 at Stockholm. In 1913 she was sold to Waxholmsbolaget, with whom she remained in service until 1951, when she went aground and sustained hull damage. In 1952 she was sold for scrap, and towed to the River Tyne in England, where she was scrapped.

History 
In 1913, she was sold to Waxholms Nya Ångfartygs AB, better known as Waxholmsbolaget, who placed her in service on the route between Stockholm and Bergshamra.

On the 18 August 1951, the Östanå II went aground on a trip from Svartlöga to Stockholm and started to take on water. All the passengers and crew were safely evacuated, and three days later the vessel was salvaged. However she was not repaired, and the following year she was sold for scrap, and taken in tow for a journey to a scrapyard in Newcastle upon Tyne in England. Whilst crossing the North Sea the tow was lost, but the Östanå II was then taken in tow by the Scottish steamship Quentin and taken to the River Tyne, where she was sold to CW Dorkin & Co of Gateshead and finally scrapped.

References

1908 ships
Passenger ships of Sweden
Ships built in Stockholm
Steamships of Sweden